Repetto is a French ballet shoe company. It was founded in 1947 by Rose Repetto, after her son, choreographer Roland Petit, would come home from classes complaining of sore feet. Repetto provides ballet shoes for 
the Opéra National de Paris and many other well-known French ballet companies.
, the company had 60 million euros in revenues and employed 340 people.

History
Rose Repetto created her first ballet shoes for her son in 1947 and soon thereafter opened up her first workshop near the National Opera of Paris. The company gained fame from creating the "Cendrillon" ballerina flat for French ballet dancer and actress Brigitte Bardot's 1956 film Et Dieu… créa la femme. In 1959, Repetto opened up a store at 22 rue de la Paix in Paris near the National Opera that remains open today.

The brand fell out of the limelight after Repetto's death in 1984, but French entrepreneur Jean-Marc Gaucher helped turn around the company when he took over as CEO in 1999. Since then, Repetto has expanded internationally and tried to define itself as a luxury lifestyle brand. It has branched out into a footwear collection for women, men and children, ready-to-wear, small leather goods and fragrances. The company opened its first store in America in the New York City neighborhood of Soho in the fall of 2015.

References

External links

Repetto's Products
La Saga Repetto (in french)

Shoe companies of France
Pointe shoe manufacturers
Dancewear companies